Reza Radmanesh (1905/1906–1983) was an Iranian physicist, communist politician and general secretary of the Tudeh Party of Iran. According to Abbas Milani, he was "one of the most prominent members of the Iranian communist movement".

Early life and education 
Radmanesh was born into a Gilak landed upper-class family. He helped the local Jangalis as a teenager; and joined the Socialist Party while he studied at Dar ul-Funun. He went to France to study physics, and met Taghi Arani, before he returned to Iran as a junior member of The Fifty-Three. He was sentenced to five years of imprisonment.

Career 
Radmanesh was a leading and dominating personality in the Tudeh Party of Iran, serving as a member of the party's central committee, head of its youth wing and its parliamentary leader before taking office as the first Secretary in 1948.

References

 

Iranian communists
1900s births
1983 deaths
First Secretaries of Tudeh Party of Iran
Socialist Party (Iran) politicians
Iranian expatriates in East Germany
Iranian expatriates in France
Academic staff of the University of Tehran
People from Lahijan
Heads of youth wings of political parties in Iran
Central Committee of the Tudeh Party of Iran members
Tudeh Party of Iran MPs
Members of the 14th Iranian Majlis